The 1921–22 Scottish Districts season is a record of all the rugby union matches for Scotland's district teams.

History

Glasgow District beat Edinburgh District in the Inter-City match.

Results

Inter-City

Glasgow District:

Edinburgh District:

Other Scottish matches

Midlands District:

North of Scotland District:

Trial matches

Provinces District:

Scotland Probables: 

Scotland Probables:

Scotland Possibles:

English matches

No other District matches played.

International matches

No touring matches this season.

References

1921–22 in Scottish rugby union
Scottish Districts seasons